Richard John McCormack (born July 20, 1947) is an American political figure in the state of Vermont.  A Democrat, He represented the three-member at-large Windsor County district in the Vermont Senate from 1989 to 2003.  In 2006, he was again elected to the State Senate, and he has been reelected every two years from 2008 to 2018.

Early life
Richard "Dick" McCormack was born in New York City on July 20, 1947, a son of John Houghton McCormack and Irene Cecile (Tuohy) McCormack.  He was raised and educated in New York City, and graduated from Bayside High School in Queens in 1965.  McCormack graduated from Hofstra University in 1970 with a Bachelor of Arts degree in U.S. History and moved to Bethel, Vermont later that year.  McCormack studied Secondary Education at Castleton State College from 1977 to 1978 and received a Master's degree in Environmental Law from Vermont Law School in 2002.

Career
McCormack was a professional musician and singer from 1967 to 2000 and taught U.S. history and government and the history of rock and roll in the Vermont State Colleges system.  McCormack's shows typically included songs, storytelling, and commentary, and he performed at coffee houses, concert halls, weddings, bars and churches.  He recorded nine albums, and also hosted a show on Vermont Public Radio, Dick McCormack’s Veranda.

Before entering the State Senate, McCormack was a Bethel justice of the peace from 1984 to 1989.  In addition, he served on the District III Environmental Commission and was its chairman from 1986 to 1989.

McCormack has served on the board of directors for several civic organizations, including: Vermont Public Interest Research Group; Vermont Adult Basic Education; AIDS Community Resource Network; the Emerge Family Access Center; Champlain Valley Folk Festival; Earth Rights Institute, Operation Laundry List; and Vermont Sierra Club.

Vermont Senate
A Democrat, McCormack ran unsuccessfully for the Vermont Senate in 1988.  In October 1989, McCormack was appointed to fill the Senate vacancy created by the resignation of Stephen Reynes.  He was elected to a full term in 1990 and reelected every two years from 1992 to 2000, and served from 1989 to 2003.  From 1997 to 2001, McCormack was the body's Majority Leader.

In 2006, McCormack was again elected to the State Senate.  He was reelected every two years from 2008 to 2018, and has served since 2007.  During his Senate service, McCormack has served at different times as chairman of the Natural Resources and Energy Committee, vice chairman of the Judiciary Committee, and a member of the Health and Welfare, Education, General Affairs and Housing, Institutions, Finance, Appropriations, Judicial Rules, Legislative Rules, and Administrative Rules Committees.  He has also served as co-chairman of the legislature's Climate Solutions Caucus.

Family
In 1979, McCormack married Joan Carol Connor.  They divorced in 1981.  From 1994 to 1996, he was married to Wendy Henderson.

In 2004, McCormack married Cindy Metcalf, who formerly served as chief of staff to Lieutenant Governor Doug Racine and chairwoman of the Vermont Democratic Party.  Between them, they have five grown children and six grandchildren.

Curt McCormack, a longtime member of the Vermont House of Representatives, is McCormack's brother.

References

Sources

Internet

Newspapers

External links
McCormack for Senate at Facebook.com
Dick McCormack Archives at VT Digger.org

Books

1947 births
Living people
21st-century American politicians
Hofstra University alumni
Vermont Law and Graduate School alumni
People from Bethel, Vermont
Democratic Party Vermont state senators
Majority leaders of the Vermont Senate